Pristimantis reclusas is a species of frogs in the family Craugastoridae.

It is found in Colombia and possibly Venezuela.
It is threatened by habitat loss.

References

reclusas
Endemic fauna of Colombia
Amphibians of Colombia
Amphibians of the Andes
Frogs of South America
Amphibians described in 2003
Taxonomy articles created by Polbot